Marcel Hilßner (born 30 January 1995) is a German professional footballer who plays as a winger. He is currently a free agent after being released by Coventry City. He is a former German youth international having represented his nation from U16 to U19 level between 2010 and 2013.

Club career

Werder Bremen
Hilßner spent his formative years at FC Sachsen Leipzig before being signed by Werder Bremen in 2009. Having impressed at youth level from then on, he was awarded a year extension on a senior contract with the club on 8 June 2015. Hilßner made his senior debut for Bremen on 26 September in a 3–0 loss to Bayer Leverkusen, being brought on by manager Viktor Skripnik as a second-half substitute for Levin Öztunalı; it was the only senior appearance he made for the club before joining Dynamo Dresden in 2016. In his last match with Werder Bremen's reserve team, he scored twice in a 2–1 win over VfR Aalen which secured the side's survival in 3. Liga.

Dynamo Dresden
On 25 April 2016, it was announced that Hilßner would be joining Dynamo Dresden on a free transfer at the end of the season and that he had signed a three-year deal with the newly promoted German Second Division side. He made his debut for the club on 4 November 2016, coming on as an 88th-minute substitute for Erich Berko in a 3–0 win over Fortuna Düsseldorf. He registered his first assist on 4 April 2017, setting up Erich Berko for the equalizer in Dresden's 2–1 win over Heidenheim.

Hansa Rostock
On 7 August 2017, Hilßner joined 3. Liga side Hansa Rostock on a two-year deal. He scored his first goal for the club on 20 October, netting in a 2–0 win over VfL Osnabrück. Later in the season, he suffered a torn cruciate ligament which ruled him out for the remainder of the campaign.

SC Paderborn
On 28 May 2019, Hilßner joined SC Paderborn on a two-year deal.

On 28 January 2020, Hilßner was loaned out to Hallescher FC for the remainder of the 2019–20 season.

Coventry City
Hilßner joined Coventry City on 16 July 2020 on a three-year deal.

On 31 January 2023, Hilßner left Coventry without even managing to make a single senior appearance.

Loan to Oldham Athletic
During the 2021 January transfer window, Marcel joined Oldham Athletic on loan for the remainder of the season.

Loan to FSV Zwickau
On 26 January 2022, Hilßner joined 3. Liga side FSV Zwickau on loan until the end of the season.

Career statistics

References

External links
 
 

1995 births
Living people
Footballers from Leipzig
German footballers
Germany youth international footballers
Association football wingers
Bundesliga players
2. Bundesliga players
3. Liga players
Regionalliga players
SV Werder Bremen II players
SV Werder Bremen players
Dynamo Dresden players
FC Hansa Rostock players
SC Paderborn 07 players
Hallescher FC players
Coventry City F.C. players
Oldham Athletic A.F.C. players
FSV Zwickau players
German expatriate footballers
German expatriate sportspeople in England
Expatriate footballers in England